was a former Japanese football player who formerly played for Sagan Tosu.

Club statistics
Updated to 24 February 2019.

References

External links

Profile at Sagan Tosu

1985 births
Living people
Association football people from Nagano Prefecture
Japanese footballers
J1 League players
J2 League players
Sagan Tosu players
Vegalta Sendai players
Association football midfielders